Urtsaki is a rural locality (a selo) in Sutbuksky Selsoviet, Dakhadayevsky District, Republic of Dagestan, Russia. The population was 300 as of 2010. There are 3 streets.

Geography
Urtsaki is located 26 km southwest of Urkarakh (the district's administrative centre) by road. Sutbuk and Kubachi are the nearest rural localities.

References 

Rural localities in Dakhadayevsky District